Nicolás Agustín Muscio (born 18 February 1998) is an Argentine professional footballer who plays as a midfielder for Argentino de Quilmes.

Career
Muscio is a product of Racing Club's academy, having joined in 2003 from Atlético Pampero. His breakthrough into senior football arrived under manager Eduardo Coudet in May 2019, as he was selected as a substitute for a Copa de la Superliga quarter-final with Tigre. He subsequently made his professional debut in the second leg encounter, replacing Nery Domínguez after seventy-eight minutes.

Career statistics
.

References

External links

1998 births
Living people
Sportspeople from Lanús
Argentine footballers
Association football midfielders
Racing Club de Avellaneda footballers
Club Atlético Temperley footballers
Deportivo Armenio footballers
Argentino de Quilmes players
Primera Nacional players
Primera B Metropolitana players
21st-century Argentine people